Lawrence Westbrook (born January 17, 1988) is an American professional basketball point guard. As a senior with the University of Minnesota Golden Gophers basketball team, he averaged 12.2 points per game in the 2008-09 season, and was the Golden Gophers' leading scorer.

He is also the cousin of former NFL player Brian Westbrook.

High school career
As a junior at Chandler High School in Chandler, Arizona, he led the nation in scoring with 41.0 points per contest. He had 883 points in just 22 games that season. He then transferred to Winchendon Prep High in Winchendon, Massachusetts as a senior, where he averaged 19.0 points per game as a senior. Rivals.com named him the 75th best high school basketball player of the decade. He signed with the Minnesota Golden Gophers in the fall of 2005.

College career
Westbrook was leading scorer for the Gophers in the 2008-09 season. He has started almost every game in both his sophomore and junior seasons. In a January 15, 2009 overtime win against the Wisconsin Badgers at the Kohl Center, he had a season-high 29 points, including nine in the extra session, while going 10-for-16 from the field (including 7-of-7 from the free-throw line and 2-for-2 from beyond the arc). He also hit the game-tying 3-pointer with 2 seconds remaining in regulation.

College statistics

Notes

External links
Lawrence Westbrook- Gophersports.com bio
Profile at Eurobasket.com
NBA D-League Profile

1988 births
Living people
American expatriate basketball people in Germany
American expatriate basketball people in Israel
American expatriate basketball people in Romania
American men's basketball players
Basketball players from Arizona
CS Universitatea Cluj-Napoca (men's basketball) players
Dakota Wizards players
Maine Red Claws players
Riesen Ludwigsburg players
Minnesota Golden Gophers men's basketball players
Point guards
Sportspeople from Chandler, Arizona
Texas Legends players